Queijo de Nisa is a semi-hard sheep's milk cheese from the municipality of Nisa, in the subregion of Alto Alentejo in Portugal. It is created from raw milk, which is coagulated, then curdled using an infusion of thistle. It is yellowish white, with a robust flavor and a somewhat acidic finish.

Since 1996, Nisa cheese has a protected geographical status. It is registered and has a Protected designation of origin (PDO) by the European Commission.

It was honored by the magazine Wine Spectator as one of the world's top 100 in an edition devoted to cheese: "100 Great Cheeses".

See also
 List of Portuguese cheeses with protected status

References

Portuguese cheeses
Portuguese products with protected designation of origin
Cheeses with designation of origin protected in the European Union